The Children in Room E4: American Education on Trial is a 2007 American non-fiction book written by Susan Eaton.

Overview
The interwoven narratives of the lives and educations of students in Room E4 of Simpson-Waverly Elementary School in Hartford, Connecticut and of a successful landmark civil rights case, Sheff v. O'Neill, that argued that Latino and black children were being denied an equal education because of the segregation of the state's public schools.

References

2007 non-fiction books
American non-fiction books
Books about race and ethnicity
Books about education
English-language books